Megan Tapper (née Simmonds; born 18 March 1994) is a Jamaican athlete competing in the sprint hurdles. She represented her country at the 2016 Summer Olympics reaching the semifinals. She also represented her country in the 2017 World Athletics Championships in London where she made it to the semi-finals. In 2018, she competed at the Commonwealth games finishing 7th in the final. In 2019, she was a member of the Jamaican shuttle hurdles relay in Yokohama, Japan as well as the team in Doha, Qatar at the world championships where she made the final in the 100m hurdles.

She has qualified to represent Jamaica at the 2020 Summer Olympics.

Her personal best in the 100 metres hurdles is 12.53 seconds set in Tokyo in 2021. She celebrated her third place finish with the flag of her country wrapped around her, exuding the same joy she exhibits routinely.

International competitions

1Did not finish in the final

References

1994 births
Living people
Sportspeople from Kingston, Jamaica
Jamaican female hurdlers
Athletes (track and field) at the 2010 Summer Youth Olympics
Athletes (track and field) at the 2016 Summer Olympics
Athletes (track and field) at the 2020 Summer Olympics
Olympic athletes of Jamaica
Athletes (track and field) at the 2018 Commonwealth Games
Commonwealth Games competitors for Jamaica
Athletes (track and field) at the 2019 Pan American Games
Pan American Games bronze medalists for Jamaica
Pan American Games medalists in athletics (track and field)
World Athletics Championships athletes for Jamaica
Medalists at the 2019 Pan American Games
Medalists at the 2020 Summer Olympics
Olympic bronze medalists for Jamaica
Olympic bronze medalists in athletics (track and field)
20th-century Jamaican women
21st-century Jamaican women